Gallatin may refer to the following:

Places
Gallatin, California, now part of Downey
Gallatin, Missouri, a city
Gallatin, New York, a town
Gallatin, Tennessee, a city
Gallatin, Texas, a city
Gallatin County, Illinois
Gallatin County, Kentucky  
Gallatin County, Montana
Gallatin Field Airport in Bozeman, Montana
Gallatin River, in Wyoming and Montana
Gallatin Range, includes ten mountains in Wyoming and Montana
Gallatin National Forest, Montana

Ships
USS Gallatin (1807), a sailing ship used initially by the U.S. Revenue Cutter Service, fought in the War of 1812
USS Gallatin (APA-169), a Haskell-class attack transport acquired by the U.S. Navy during World War II
USRC Gallatin, various cutters of the U.S. Revenue Cutter Service
USCGC Gallatin, two U.S. Coast Guard ships

Schools
Gallatin College, Montana State University
Gallatin School of Individualized Study, part of New York University
Gallatin High School (disambiguation)
Gallatin School (Uniontown, Pennsylvania), on the National Register of Historic Places

Other uses
Gallatin (surname)
Gallatin Bank Building, constructed in 1887 in Manhattan
The codename of an Intel Xeon microprocessor